Shaganappi is a residential neighbourhood in the southwest quadrant of Calgary, Alberta. It is located between 17 Avenue SW and the Bow River. The Shaganappi golf course is located north of the Bow Trail.

The name Shaganappi is of Cree origin, and was used as far back as 1870. The land was annexed to the City of Calgary in 1910 and Shaganappi was established as a neighbourhood in 1949. It is represented in the Calgary City Council by the Ward 8 councillor.

Demographics

Residents in this community had a median household income of $36,368 in 2000, and there were 19.5% low income residents living in the neighbourhood. As of 2000, 10.6% of the residents were immigrants. A proportion of 27.3% of the buildings were condominiums or apartments, and 52.8% of the housing was used for renting.

Education
The community is served by Alex Ferguson Elementary public school.

See also
List of neighbourhoods in Calgary

References

External links
Shaganappi Community Website
Shaganappi Community Association
Shaganappi Real Estate

Neighbourhoods in Calgary